Percival Creek is a stream in Thurston County in the U.S. state of Washington. The creek empties into Percival Cove, a bay within Capitol Lake.

Percival Creek was named after Captain Percival, an early settler.

See also
List of rivers of Washington

References

Rivers of Thurston County, Washington
Rivers of Washington (state)